Catherine Phiri is a Zambian professional boxer. She held the WBC female bantamweight title from 2016 to 2017 and challenged twice for the WBC female super-bantamweight title in 2017 and 2019. As of May 2022, she is ranked as the world's tenth best active female super-bantamweight by BoxRec.

Boxing career
Catherine debuted on 25 July 2011 when she defeated Zambian boxer Esther Chalwe at the National Sports Development Centre in Lusaka. She won the WBC female bantamweight title by defeating reigning champion Yazmín Rivas on 30 January 2016 in Mexico. She became the first Zambian to win a WBC title.

Her 13th fight was on 27 August 2016 at Lusaka's Government Complex where she retained her WBC title with a first-round stoppage victory against Gabisile Tshabalala. She lost the title in her next fight, suffering the second defeat of her career against Mariana Juárez on 1 April 2017, in Mexico City, Mexico.

On 17 December 2016, she was honoured by the World Boxing Council for being the first boxer from African to win the WBC bantamweight title. On 2 November 2017, she was defeated by Fatuma Zarika in a WBC super-bantamweight title fight, losing by unanimous decision with the judges' scorecards reading 97–92, 98–91 and 99–92. Zarika was the defending champion.

Awards 
Catherine Phiri was also given an academic scholarship from the Justina Mutale Foundations Scholarship Programme on 9 June 2016. She is expected to go and study Sports Management at the European School of Economics in Italy. President of Zambia Edgar Chagwa Lungu honoured Catherine Phiri with the Zambia insignia of meritorious achievement award for her accomplishment on Africa Freedom Day, 25 May 2017.

Professional boxing record

References

External links
 

Year of birth missing (living people)
Date of birth missing (living people)
Living people
Zambian women boxers
World boxing champions
Sportspeople from Lusaka
Bantamweight boxers
Super-bantamweight boxers
African Boxing Union champions
World Boxing Council champions